Judy Napangardi Watson (–2016), also known as Judy Watson Napangardi and Kumanjayi Napangardi Watson, was an Aboriginal Australian and a senior female painter from the Yuendumu community in the Northern Territory, Australia.

Life
Judy was born around 1925 at Yarungkanji on Mount Doreen Station. Her people, the Warlpiri, were living a traditional nomadic life at that time. They frequently made long journeys by foot to their ancestral country on the border of the Tanami and Gibson Deserts, and lived at Mina Mina and Yingipurlangu at different times.

She had ten children.

She died at Yuendumu on 17 May 2016.

Work 
Napangardi started painting in the 1980s in a "dragged dotting"  style. Her combination of vivid colour, highly detailed works and high-level composition led to widespread appreciation in the art world. Her paintings often describe the Mina Mina country. She was a member of the Warlukurlangu Artists community of Yuendumu.

Well known for the distinctive style of painting that she developed alongside her sister Maggie Napangardi Watson, who taught her painting skills, she was a significant contributor to contemporary Indigenous Australian art.

Galleries displaying her art
 Art Gallery of New South Wales, Sydney
 Aboriginal Art Museum, Utrecht
 Gordon Darling Foundation, Canberra
 Flinders University Art Museum, Adelaide
 National Gallery of Australia, Canberra
 National Gallery of Victoria
 Museum and Art Gallery of the Northern Territory, Darwin
 South Australian Museum, Adelaide
 Kluge-Ruhe Aboriginal Art Collection, University of Virginia, Charlottesville
 Stamp Gallery of Art, College Park MD

References

External links

1920s births
Australian Aboriginal artists
2016 deaths
Artists from the Northern Territory
Warlpiri people
20th-century Australian women artists
21st-century Australian women artists